Pellamtho Panenti (English: What is the use of wife?) is a 2003 Telugu drama film directed by S. V. Krishna Reddy and produced by Kumar under the banner Sri Jagannatha Cine & Media creations. This film stars Venu, Laya, Kalyani in the lead roles.

Plot 
Madhu runs a beauty parlor. He does not believe in love and marriage and thinks that he can manage his life without a wife. A medical transcriptionist named Sirisha falls in love with him at first sight and tries all possible ways to attract him. But he rejects her proposal saying that love is just a business. Madhu visits other country on a business purpose and happens to meet another girl Kalyani. At first Kalyani hates him because he follows call girls. However she starts developing feelings for him after they return to India. He does the same with her too when she tries to propose her love. Both girls pester him to love them. Once Kalyani directly goes to his house and declares herself as his would be wife. Kalyani also reveals that she is going to die soon because of a bullet present in her head. At first Madhu does not believe her and gets irritated by constant following and throws her out. However, when Madhu tells Sirisha about this, she examines her diagnostic report and finds whatever Kalyani told to be true. The doctors had advised her not to go for the surgery which would result in immediate death. Sirisha also encourages Madhu to accept Kalyani. So he tries to share his love with her. Meanwhile, Sirisha also finds out the German doctor who dealt her case. Madhu and Sirisha travel to Germany and convinces the doctor to perform a surgery. Kalynani is saved after the surgery and tells Madhu that Sirisha is his true love. Finally Madhu and Sirisha are married to each other.

Cast 
 Venu as Madhu, owner of a beauty parlor
 Laya as Sirisha, a medical transcription professional
 Kalyani as Kalyani
 Kota Srinivasa Rao as Kalyani's father
 Brahmanandam as Madhu's assistant
 Giri Babu as Madhu's father
 Kondavalasa Lakshmana Rao as Sirisha's father
 Telangana Shakuntala as Sirish's mother
 Ali
 Uttej in a cameo
 Gundu Hanumantha Rao
 Ananth Babu
 Prabhakar
 Rajitha
 Ganesh

Production 
After the success of his previous film Pellam Oorelithe, director S. V. Krishna Reddy thought of a film with similar background. Kalyani, who did a native Telugu girl in successful movies like Vasantham, Kabaddi Kabaddi, Avunu Valliddaru Ishtapaddaru was chosen for a critical role for this film.

Music 
Music for this film is composed by the director S. V. Krishna Reddy himself like most of his other films. The album has six tracks.
 "Enni Janmalaina Chalava"
 "Koosindi Koyila"
 "Malle Chettu Ninnu Chusi"
 "O Lammo"
 "Oka Nimisham ayina"
 "Vinando"

References

External links 
 Pellamtho Panenti on YouTube

2003 films
Indian romance films
Films directed by S. V. Krishna Reddy
Films scored by S. V. Krishna Reddy
2000s romance films
2000s Telugu-language films